Crushes (The Covers Mixtape) is the sixth full-length release by husband/wife duo Mates of State. It was released digitally via iTunes as well as from the band's website on June 15, 2010. On the band's website, they explained the reason for doing a covers album. "We've been talking about doing a covers record for a long time.  We'd hear a great song at 2 AM while driving the straight line from one part of Texas to the next, and all we'd want to do is play that song as if we had written it." The album was recorded and produced by Kori Gardner and Jason Hammel, making it their first self-produced record to date. The album was mixed by Peter Katis (The National, Interpol, Frightened Rabbit, Jónsi), a longtime collaborator. The third track "Sleep the Clock Around" was featured in the film The Art of Getting By.

Track listing

References 
 

Mates of State albums
2010 mixtape albums
Covers albums